is the name for numerous mountains in Japan.

Mount Kenashi (Otaru), a  mountain in Otaru, Hokkaidō
Mount Kenashi (Yoichi), a  mountain on the border of Otaru and Yoichi, Hokkaidō
Mount Kenashi (Setana), a  mountain in Setana, Hokkaidō
Mount Kenashi (Hakodate), a  mountain in Hakodate, Hokkaidō
Mount Kenashi (Akita), a mountain in Akita Prefecture
Mount Kenashi (Niigata), a mountain in Niigata Prefecture
Mount Kenashi (Nagano), a mountain in Iiyama, Nagano Prefecture
Mount Kenashi (Yamanashi), a  mountain in Yamanashi Prefecture
Mount Kenashi (Yamanashi, Shizuoka), a  mountain in Yamanashi and Shizuoka prefectures
Mount Kenashi (Tottori), a  mountain in Tottori Prefecture
Mount Kenashi (Okayama, Tottori), a mountain in Okayama and Tottori prefectures
Mount Kenashi (Hiroshima), a mountain in Hiroshima Prefecture
Mount Kenashi (Shimane), a  mountain in Shimane Prefecture